The Convention of Philippine Baptist Churches (Hiligaynon: Kasapulanan sang Bautista nga Pilipinhon) is a Baptist Christian denomination churches union, affiliated with the Baptist World Alliance, in Philippines. Headquartered in Jaro, Iloilo City, Philippines, it was founded in 1900 as the first and oldest organized Baptist churches union in the Philippines when the country was opened to Protestant American missions after the succession of the Philippine islands by Spain to the United States in 1898.

The CPBC is responsible through association and concordat with the American Baptist Foreign Mission Society in founding and having affiliation presently with the Jaro Evangelical Church (the first Baptist church in the Philippines and first Protestant church outside Manila), Central Philippine University (the first Baptist and second American university in the Philippines in Asia), the CPU College of Theology (first Baptist Theological Seminary in the Philippines), the Filamer Christian University (first Baptist school in the Philippines), and the Capiz Emnanuel Hospital (first Baptist hospital in the Philippines). The Iloilo Mission Hospital on the other hand, was founded by the Protestant Presbyterians as the first American and Protestant hospital in the Philippines, but it was handed over to the Baptists (CPBC) in the 1930s in which it is subsequently affiliated with.

History

The Convention of Philippine Baptist Churches has its origins in a foreign mission of the American Baptist Missionary Union on the island of Panay in February 1900, when the Philippines islands was opened to the Protestant missions after it was ceded to the United States administration.

Eric Lund, a Swedish Baptist minister working under the auspices of the American Baptist Foreign Mission Society and one of the founding fathers of the Jaro Evangelical Church, translated the entire Bible into Hiligaynon, and the New Testament into two other dialects. In 1905, the Bible School and Jaro Industrial School were established through a grant given by the American Baptist, business magnate and philanthropist, John D. Rockefeller. The two schools later merged and became Central Philippine University, the first Baptist and second American university in the Philippines and Asia.

In 1935 the formal formation of Convention of Philippine Baptist Churches was established. The Convention has allowed ordination of women to the ministry since 1980.

According to a denomination census released in 2020, it claimed 1,079 churches and 600,000 members.

Core Mission Principles
Being grounded in the Biblical tradition
Engagement in prophetic and priestly functions
Building a community that heals and restores broken ties
Developing of strong and responsible leaders
Achieving stability through full support of member churches and organizations
Building of a deeper and stronger relationship with other mission partners
Deep and genuine concern for the lost, the poor, the weak and the needy
Faithfulness to the Baptist legacy of missionary service
A dynamic, relevant and responsive servant organization
Deep commitment to the implementation of a holistic and comprehensive ministry
Full use of appropriate technology to enhance programs and ministries

Beliefs 
The Convention has a Baptist confession of faith in Protestant theology. It is a member of the Baptist World Alliance and maintains ties with the American Baptist Churches USA.

Education
Baptist missionaries founded many schools and universities in the Philippines. Most notable of these is Central Philippine University (CPU), the first Baptist and second American university in the Philippines and in Asia (after Silliman University in Dumaguete), while Filamer Christian University is the first Baptist school in the Philippines.

CPU's earliest forerunner, the Central Philippine University College of Theology which was established four months earlier than the university's second precursor, the Jaro Industrial School, is the first Baptist theological seminary in the Philippines.

The CPU College of Nursing, an academic institution for nurses founded in 1906 as Union Mission Hospital Training School for Nurses by the Presbyterian Protestant American missionaries through the present day Iloilo Mission Hospital, is the first Nursing School in the Philippines. The Central Philippine University College of Nursing is also one of the leading nursing schools in the Philippines.

Central Philippine University's official student governing body, the CPU Republic (Central Philippine University Republic), is the oldest student government in the South East Asia. It was organized in 1905, one year after the founding of the school. The University's official publication, the Central Echo (CE) is the official student publication of CPU. It was founded in 1910, five years after Jaro Industrial School opened. It is one of the oldest student publications in the Philippines.

See also
 Evangelicalism in the Philippines
 Bible
 Born again
 Baptist beliefs
 Worship service (evangelicalism)
 Jesus Christ
 Believers' Church

References

Baptists Around the World, by Albert W. Wardin, Jr.
The Baptist Heritage: Four Centuries of Baptist Witness, by H. Leon McBeth

External links
 Official website
 Philippine Baptist Centennial History
 Adherents.com
 Bacolod Christian Center - official Web Site

Baptist Christianity in the Philippines
Members of the World Council of Churches
Christian organizations established in 1935
Baptist denominations in Asia
Baptist denominations established in the 20th century
Evangelicalism in the Philippines